Katha Deithili Maa Ku  is a 2004 Oriya sports drama film directed by Himanshu Parija. For the first time in Oriya film history, the film was shot abroad (Japan, Montreal).It was highest grossing Odia film of 2004.It is a remake of the 2003 Telugu movie Amma Nanna O Tamila Ammayi, starring Ravi Teja and Asin.

Plot

Abinash Patnaik is a state level boxer. To participate in the state championship, he leaves his wife Sumita and son Ajay, because one condition of the contest is participants should be unmarried. He pretends to be a bachelor, and in an unavoidable circumstance, he marries another woman, Rama. Ajay, who is also a boxer, tries to unite with his stepmother and father as he had promised to his mother as she died.

Cast
Siddhanta Mahapatra as	 Ajay Patnaik
Rituparna Sengupta as	 Seema
Bijay Mohanty 	as Abinash Patnaik
Laboni Sarkar 	as Sumitra Patnaik
Runu Parija as	 Rama Patnaik
Satyaki Misra 	 as Bikram
Harihara Mahapatra 	as  Dhanda
Braja Singh 	as  Chanda
Debu Bose 	as Rama's father
Pinky Banerjee

References

External links 
 

2003 films
Odia remakes of Telugu films
Indian boxing films
Films shot in Montreal
Films shot in Japan
2000s Odia-language films